A cup is a small open container used for drinks.

Cup or cups may also refer to:

Cooking
Cup (unit)
Measuring cup
Cups, type of traditional English punch

Music
"Cups" (song), a 2011 song by Anna Kendrick
"Cups", a 2000 song by Roy Nathanson and Debbie Harry from Fire at Keaton's Bar and Grill
"Cups", a 1999 single by Underworld from Beaucoup Fish

Games and sports
 Competition in a knock-out format; as it lacks statistical significance, the winner is not necessarily the highest-rated participant
 Davis Cup, FA Cup and FIFA World Cup are such sports competitions
 Cup or Cup Series, a NASCAR competition
 A cup-shaped trophy
 Athletic cup, protective equipment for male athletes' genitalia
 Cup game, a clapping game that involves tapping and hitting a cup using a defined rhythm
 Cups (game), a form of mancala
 Cups, a fictional game in on Friends

Tarot
 Suit of Cups, a card suit used in tarot
 Ace of Cups, the ace card from the suit Suit of Cups
 Two of Cups, the second card from the Suit of Cups
 Three of Cups, the third card from the Suit of Cups
 Four of Cups, the fourth card from the Suit of Cups
 Five of Cups, the fifth card from the Suit of Cups
 Six of Cups, the sixth card from the Suit of Cups
 Seven of Cups, the seventh card from the Suit of Cups
 Eight of Cups, the eighth card from the Suit of Cups
 Nine of Cups, the ninth card from the Suit of Cups
 Ten of Cups, the tenth card from the Suit of Cups
 Knight of Cups, the knight card from the Suit of Cups
 Queen of Cups, the queen card from the Suit of Cups
 King of Cups, the king card from the Suit of Cups

Other uses
 Consortium for Upper-level Physics Software, a software-development project developed by Robert Ehrlich and others
 CUPS (Common Unix Printing System), a Unix print server
 Copper units of pressure, type of chamber pressure measurement in firearms
 Cups (app), a mobile app for coffee
 Menstrual cup
 The symbol ∪, used to denote union (set theory).
 Cup product in algebraic topology, denoted by the operator 
 Cup and ring mark, a form of prehistoric art
 Silphium perfoliatum or cup-plant, a member of the sunflower family
 Cup, the part of a bra that covers a breast

See also
The Cup (disambiguation)
CUP (disambiguation)
Cupp (disambiguation)
Cupping therapy, form of alternative medicine in which local suction is created on the skin
 Friendship cup 
 Fuddling cup, a three-dimensional puzzle

hy:Գավաթ
io:Taso
it:Coppa
ht:Gode
hu:Csésze (egyértelműsítő lap)
tl:Kopa
zh:杯子